Rudy W. Roethlisberger (April 9, 1894 – January 16, 1957) was an American politician and farmer.

Born in Wellman, Iowa, Roethlisberger went to school in Tennessee. He moved to Wisconsin at age 16 and married Minnie Massey (1893–1961). He was a farmer in the Town of Verona, Dane County, Wisconsin. Roethlisberger served on the Dane County Board of Supervisors, was chairman of the Verona Town Board, and served on the school board. Roethlisberger served in the Wisconsin State Assembly from 1945 to 1949 and was a Republican. He died in a hospital in Madison, Wisconsin.

References

External links

1894 births
1957 deaths
People from Verona, Wisconsin
People from Washington County, Iowa
Farmers from Wisconsin
Mayors of places in Wisconsin
County supervisors in Wisconsin
School board members in Wisconsin
Republican Party members of the Wisconsin State Assembly
20th-century American politicians